Catch Up was a children's television series which aired on CBC Television in Canada during the 1978–1979 season.

Although the series did not continue past its first year, its hosts would proceed to careers of international scope:
 Margot Pinvidic continued acting on various movie and television productions
 Catch Up's music segments were performed by the Christopher Ward Band, whose namesake would become one of MuchMusic's first VJs. Ward also became a songwriter for Alannah Myles and other prominent artists.

External links 
 Queen's University Directory of CBC Television Series (Catch Up archived listing link via archive.org)
 TVArchive.ca: Catch Up
 

CBC Television original programming
1970s Canadian children's television series
1978 Canadian television series debuts
1979 Canadian television series endings